Euaresta philodema is a species of fruit fly in the genus Euaresta of the family Tephritidae.

Distribution
Chile

References

Tephritinae
Insects described in 1914
Diptera of South America
Endemic fauna of Chile